D-lactate dehydrogenase (lactic acid dehydrogenase, lactic acid dehydrogenase, D-specific lactic dehydrogenase, D-(-)-lactate dehydrogenase (NAD+), D-lactic acid dehydrogenase, D-lactic dehydrogenase) is an enzyme with systematic name (R)-lactate:NAD+ oxidoreductase. This enzyme catalyses the following chemical reaction

 (R)-lactate + NAD+  pyruvate + NADH

References

External links 
 

EC 1.1.1